The Lady of Scandal is a 1930 American pre-Code romance, comedy film, melodrama directed by Sidney Franklin based on the 1927 play The High Road by Frederick Lonsdale and starring Ruth Chatterton, Basil Rathbone and Ralph Forbes. Its plot follows a British actress who becomes involved with a member of an aristocratic family, who try desperately to thwart the match. It is also known by the alternative title of The High Road.

Plot summary

Cast
 Ruth Chatterton as Elsie 
 Basil Rathbone as Edward 
 Ralph Forbes as John 
 Nance O'Neil as Lady Trench 
 Frederick Kerr as Lord Trench 
 Herbert Bunston as Lord Crayle 
 Cyril Chadwick as Sir Reginald 
 Effie Ellsler as Lady Minster 
 Robert Bolder as Hilary 
 Moon Carroll as Alice 
 Mackenzie Ward as Ernest 
 Edgar Norton as Morton

References

External links
 
 
 
 

1930 films
1930s romantic comedy-drama films
Metro-Goldwyn-Mayer films
American romantic comedy-drama films
American black-and-white films
Films set in England
American films based on plays
1930 comedy films
1930 drama films
Films directed by Sidney Franklin
1930s English-language films
1930s American films